And the Spring Comes is a 2007 film directed by Gu Changwei, written by Li Qiang. This is Gu's second feature following his acclaimed feature debut Peacock. The film premiered at the 2007 Rome Film Festival, and the lead actress Jiang Wenli, also Gu Changwei's wife, won the Best Actress award.

Synopsis 
Set in a small town near Baotou, Wang Cailing is a vocal teacher who has a magnificent voice and a big dream—to be an opera (Italian Opera) singer at the National Opera House. She is not dreaming alone: There's a young man who wants to be China's Vincent van Gogh. She also meets a gay ballet dancer who is past his prime.  She falls in with a few other bohemian artists. All of them struggle not only to realize their dreams, but more pressingly, to get accepted and understood by the society.

Critical reception

Lead actress Jiang Wenli (who played Wang Cailing) won Best Actress from the Rome Film Festival and Golden Rooster Awards for her performance.

References

External links 
 
 And the Spring Comes at the Chinese Movie Database

2007 films
2000s Mandarin-language films
2007 drama films
Films directed by Gu Changwei
Chinese drama films